The National Bank of Vanuatu is the largest bank in Vanuatu. It has 29 branches and agencies across the country, and is the only commercial bank with branches outside the largest cities.

References 

Banks of Vanuatu